"You Only Love Me" is a song by English singer and songwriter Rita Ora, released on 27 January 2023 as the lead single from her upcoming third studio album.

Background and composition 

"You Only Love Me" was released for digital download and streaming by BMG on 27 January 2023 as the lead single from Ora's upcoming third studio album. The song was written by Rita Ora alongside Corey Sanders, Elle Campbell, Jon Maguire, Lewis Thompson, Phoebe Jasper and Rory Adams, and produced by Thompson and Oak Felder. Concerning its meaning, Ora elaborated, "With [the song] and my upcoming album, I wanted to capture the vulnerability I've experienced as I opened myself up to love and entered a new phase of life." Musically, "You Only Love Me" is a club, dance and electropop song.

Live performances 
Ora performed "You Only Love Me" for the first time on the ninth season of the American talk show The Tonight Show Starring Jimmy Fallon on 1 February 2023.

Music video 
The music video for "You Only Love Me" was uploaded to Ora's official YouTube channel on 27 January 2023.

Charts

Release history

References 

2023 singles
2023 songs
Rita Ora songs
BMG Rights Management singles
Dance music songs
Electropop songs
Songs written by Rita Ora
Songs written by Jon Maguire